Wallace Lake may refer to:

Wallace Lake (Louisiana), a lake in Louisiana, United States
Tom Wallace Lake, a lake in Kentucky, United States
Lake Wallace, a lake in Victoria, Australia